Sam Lafferty (born March 6, 1995) is an American professional ice hockey forward for the Toronto Maple Leafs of the National Hockey League (NHL).

Born and raised in Hollidaysburg, Pennsylvania, Lafferty attended Hollidaysburg Area High School before a spot opened at Deerfield Academy in Massachusetts. During his time at Deerfield, Lafferty tallied 38 goals and 57 assists for a total of 95 points in 74 games. Following his graduation in 2014, Lafferty was drafted by the Penguins in the 2014 NHL Entry Draft and began his collegiate hockey career with the Brown Bears men's ice hockey team. Throughout his four seasons at Brown, Lafferty was selected for the All-ECAC Third Team and named to the Second and Third Team All-Ivy League. Lafferty concluded his collegiate career on March 7, 2018, and joined the Pittsburgh Penguins organization.

Early life
Lafferty was born on March 6, 1995, in Hollidaysburg, Pennsylvania to parents Jill and Andy. His parents later divorced and his mother re-married to Dave Weaver, who coached Lafferty growing up. He was inspired to begin playing hockey following the 2000–01 NHL season where Mario Lemieux returned to the Pittsburgh Penguins. After attending a skating clinic ran by Dave, Lafferty and his younger brother Charlie played for the Mid-State Mustangs and the Altoona Trackers of the Pittsburgh Area Hockey League.

Playing career

Amateur
Lafferty spent his freshman and most of his sophomore year at Hollidaysburg Area High School before applying to prep schools. He originally committed to attend Shady Side Academy before a spot opened at Deerfield Academy in Massachusetts. During the 2013–14 season, Lafferty tallied a career-best 21 goals and 34 assists for 55 points in 25 games and was named to the 2014 Prep School All-New England team. Over his three seasons with the Deerfield Academy, Lafferty tallied 38 goals and 57 assists for a total of 95 points in 74 games. Following his graduation in 2014, Lafferty was drafted by the Penguins in the 2014 NHL Entry Draft.

Collegiate
In spite of being drafted, Lafferty played four seasons of college hockey with the Brown Bears men's ice hockey team from 2014 to 2018. During his freshman season, Lafferty played in all 31 games and finished fourth on the team with eight assists and fifth with four goals. While playing hockey as a freshman, Lafferty also competed in Division I golf and qualified for the 2015 Ivy League Men's Golf Championship. The following year, Lafferty decreased offensively and finished the season with four goals and six assists for 10 points. 

Lafferty returned to the Brown Bears for his junior season and experienced a breakout year. By January 2017, his eight goals and 19 assists ranked fourth in ECAC in scoring and third in points per game. He finished the season leading the Bears in scoring with 35 points in all 31 games played and ranked first on the team in assists. Lafferty also posted nine multiple-point games which included two four-point performances. At the conclusion of the season,  Lafferty was selected for the All-ECAC Third Team and named to the Third Team All-Ivy League. He was also named Team MVP and selected as a semifinalist for the Walter Brown Award as the best American-born college hockey player in New England.

Lafferty's scoring prowess continued through his senior season as he recorded eight goals and 14 assists for 22 points. As a second-time assistant captain, he began the season being named one of 20 candidates for the 2017–18 Senior CLASS Award. Following this, Lafferty was named the ECAC Player of the Week in February after he recorded four points in two games to help Brown to sweep Harvard and Dartmouth. In the same month, Lafferty also scored his first collegiate hat-trick on February 23, 2018, against Harvard. He finished the 2017–18 season being selected for the Second Team All-Ivy and ECAC All-Academic Team.

Professional
On March 7, 2018, Lafferty concluded his collegiate career by signing an amateur tryout agreement with the Penguins for the remainder of the 2017–18 season. He also signed a two-year, entry-level contract with the Penguins that began in the 2018–19 season. Upon joining the WBS, Lafferty recorded his first professional goal on April 3, 2018, against the Hershey Bears.

After attending their 2018 training camp, he was re-assigned to their American Hockey League (AHL) affiliate, the Wilkes-Barre/Scranton Penguins (WBS). In his first professional season, Lafferty scored 49 points in 70 games to become the teams' second-leading scorer. Lafferty made his NHL debut on October 8, 2019, in Pittsburgh's game against the Winnipeg Jets. Lafferty scored his first NHL goal and assist a few days later on October 12, 2019, in a 7–4 win over the Minnesota Wild.

On January 5, 2022, Lafferty was traded to the Chicago Blackhawks in exchange for Alexander Nylander.

During the following 2022–23 NHL season, while in the midst of breakout season in establishing new offensive highs, Lafferty was traded by the rebuilding Blackhawks to the Toronto Maple Leafs, along with Jake McCabe, and two future draft selections in exchange for Toronto's 2025 first-round pick (Conditional), Toronto's second-round pick in 2026, Joey Anderson and Pavel Gogolev on February 27, 2023.

Career statistics

Regular season and playoffs

International

Awards and honors

References

External links
 

1995 births
Living people
American men's ice hockey right wingers
Brown Bears men's ice hockey players
Chicago Blackhawks players
Ice hockey players from Pennsylvania
People from Hollidaysburg, Pennsylvania
Pittsburgh Penguins draft picks
Pittsburgh Penguins players
Toronto Maple Leafs players
Wilkes-Barre/Scranton Penguins players